William Leopold "Leo" Rush  (10 July 1890 – 5 August 1983) was an Australian rules footballer who played with Melbourne and Richmond in the Victorian Football League (VFL).

Family
The son of Roger Robert Rush (1856–1941), and Mary Rush (1856–1943), née Berry, Robert Thomas Rush was born at Clifton Hill, Victoria on 10 July 1890.

Wife
He married Alice Irene Browne on 12 May 1927.

Siblings
Four of his seven brothers also played VFL football (They are the only set of five brothers to play in the VFL/AFL):
 Robert Thomas "Bob" Rush (1880–1975) (1890–1983), who played with Collingwood from 1899 to 1908.
 Bryan Joseph Rush (1893–1982), played with Collingwood in 1913 and 1914.
 Gerald Vincent Rush (1895–1988), played with Richmond in 1920.
 Kevin Patrick Rush (1901–1984), played with Richmond in 1923 and 1924.

Education
He was awarded a Diploma in Commerce from Melbourne University in December 1927.

MBE
He was appointed a Member of the Civil Division of the Most Excellent Order of the British Empire in the 1955 New Years Honours  List.

Death
He died at his residence on 5 August 1983.

See also
 List of Australian rules football families

Notes

References	
 Hogan P: The Tigers Of Old, Richmond FC, (Melbourne), 1996.

External links 

 
 
 Leo Rush on Demonwiki

1890 births
1983 deaths
Australian Members of the Order of the British Empire
People educated at Parade College
Australian rules footballers from Melbourne
Australian Rules footballers: place kick exponents
Melbourne Football Club players
Richmond Football Club players
People from Clifton Hill, Victoria
University of Melbourne alumni sportspeople